Åsenfjorden is a fjord in Trøndelag, Norway, a branch of Trondheim Fjord extending from Strindfjorden to Fættenfjorden and Lofjorden. The fjord is located in the municipalities of Frosta, Stjørdal and Levanger.

References

Fjords of Trøndelag
Trondheimsfjord